Lost Horse Valley is a valley in Joshua Tree National Park. It has been called "the centerpiece of the park" because of the quality of its stands of Joshua trees and its geological formations. It contains the Lost Horse Mine, of significant historic importance in the park.

References

Joshua Tree National Park
Valleys of California
Valleys of Riverside County, California